The Üch-Korgon Hydro Power Plant is an active hydro power plant on the river Naryn in Shamaldy-Say, Kyrgyzstan, upstream from Uchqoʻrgʻon in Uzbekistan. Completed in 1962, it is the oldest of the three hydro power plants on the river Naryn near Tash-Kömür, 25 km downstream from the Shamaldy-Say Hydroelectric Power Station. It has 4 individual turbines with a nominal output of around 45 MW and a total nominal capacity of 180 MW.

References

Hydroelectric power stations in Kyrgyzstan
Dams in Kyrgyzstan
Hydroelectric power stations built in the Soviet Union
Dams completed in 1974
Dams on the Naryn River